The Scandinavian Alliance Mongolian Mission was a Scandinavian Protestant Christian missionary society that was involved in sending missionaries to Mongolia and China during the late Qing Dynasty (late 19th and early 20th century).

See also
Swedish Mongolian Mission
 Protestant missionary societies in China (1807–1953)
Timeline of Chinese history
Protestant missions in China 1807–1953
List of Protestant missionaries in China
Christianity in China

Christian missionary societies
Christian missions in China